Indopoa is a genus of Indian plants in the grass family. The only known species is Indopoa paupercula, native to the States of Maharashtra and Karnataka in India.

References

Chloridoideae
Endemic flora of India (region)
Grasses of India
Flora of Karnataka
Flora of Maharashtra
Monotypic Poaceae genera